Pais or PAIS may refer to:

Politics 
País, a Chilean political party
PAIS Alliance, a political party in Ecuador 
Partido pa Adelanto I Inovashon Soshal, a political party in Curaçao

Other uses 
Pais (surname)
Pais, a Chilean red wine grape
Păiș, a river of Romania
Pais (moth), a synonym of the moth genus Brephos 
PAIS International, an academic journal database
Pais Movement, a global Christian organization
Partial androgen insensitivity syndrome
Payız, a village in Azerbaijan
Payot, a hairstyle worn by some Orthodox Jewish males

See also
El País (disambiguation)